The 2001 Florida Gators baseball team represented the University of Florida in the sport of baseball during the 2001 college baseball season. The Gators competed in Division I of the National Collegiate Athletic Association (NCAA) and the Eastern Division of the Southeastern Conference (SEC). They played their home games at Alfred A. McKethan Stadium, on the university's Gainesville, Florida campus. The team was coached by Andy Lopez, who was in his seventh and final season at Florida. Lopez was dismissed after the conclusion of the season.

Roster

Schedule 

! style="background:#FF4A00;color:white;"| Regular season
|- valign="top" 

|- align="center" bgcolor="ffdddd"
| February 3  ||No. 9 Miami (FL)Rivalry||No. 13
| McKethan Stadium ||5–14
|Sheffield (1–0)
|Simon (0–1)
|None
|3,522
|0–1||–
|- align="center" bgcolor="ddffdd"
| February 7  ||||No. 17
| McKethan Stadium ||35–1
|Belflower (1–0)
|Fries
|None
|521
|1–1||–
|- align="center" bgcolor="ffdddd"
| February 9  ||at No. 9 Miami (FL)Rivalry||No. 17
|Mark Light StadiumCoral Gables, FL||4–10
|Walker (2–0)
|Simon (0–2)
|None
|4,523
|1–2||–
|- align="center" bgcolor="ffdddd"
| February 10  ||at No. 9 Miami (FL)Rivalry||No. 17
|Mark Light Stadium||7–8
|DeBold (1–1)
|Ramsey (0–1)
|None
|5,271
|1–3||–
|- align="center" bgcolor="ddffdd"
| February 13  ||||No. 22
| McKethan Stadium ||12–3
|Stanton (1–0)
|Viars (0–1)
|None
|–
|2–3
|–
|- align="center" bgcolor="ddffdd"
| February 14  ||Charleston Southern||No. 22
| McKethan Stadium ||5–2
|Simon (1–2)
|Coenen (0–1)
|Ramsey (1)
|984
|3–3
|–
|- align="center" bgcolor="ffdddd"
| February 17  ||at No. 13 Rivalry||No. 22
|Dick Howser StadiumTallahassee, FL||6–19
|Lord (1–0)
|Belflower (1–1)
|None
|4,371
|3–4||–
|- align="center" bgcolor="ddffdd"
| February 18  ||at No. 13 Florida StateRivalry||No. 22
|Dick Howser Stadium||6–5
|Simon (2–2)
|Read (1–2)
|Ramsey (2)
|4,167
|4–4||–
|- align="center" bgcolor="ffdddd"
| February 20  ||||No. 29
| McKethan Stadium ||7–11
|Thurmond (1–1)
|Hart (0–1)
|None
|922
|4–5||–
|- align="center" bgcolor="ffdddd"
| February 21  ||Winthrop||No. 29
| McKethan Stadium ||5–14
|Herauf (3–0)
|Ramshaw (0–1)
|None
|694
|4–6||–
|- align="center" bgcolor="ddffdd"
| February 24  ||No. 15 Florida StateRivalry||No. 29
| McKethan Stadium ||3–210
|Ramsey (1–1)
|Roman (0–1)
|None
|4,012
|5–6||–
|- align="center" bgcolor="ffdddd"
| February 25  ||No. 15 Florida StateRivalry||No. 29
| McKethan Stadium ||11-13
|Lynch (1–1)
|Belflower (1–2)
|Roman (1)
|3,854
|5–7||–
|- align="center" bgcolor="ddffdd"
| February 28  ||||
| McKethan Stadium ||9–7
|Brice (1–0)
|Ryals (1–1)
|Ramsey (3)
|1,224
|6–7||–
|-

|- align="center" bgcolor="ddffdd"
| March 2 |||||| McKethan Stadium ||11–8||Simon (3–2)||Garner (0–1)||None||1,114||7–7
|–
|- align="center" bgcolor="ddffdd"
| March 3 ||Central Michigan|||| McKethan Stadium ||14–3||Wells (1–0)||Horvath (0–1)||None||1,346||8–7
|–
|- align="center" bgcolor="ddffdd"
| March 4 ||Central Michigan|||| McKethan Stadium ||11–2||Ramshaw (1–1)||Opalewski (0–1)||None||716||9–7
|–
|- align="center" bgcolor="ffdddd"
| March 9 ||No. 23 |||| McKethan Stadium ||3–7||Gates (3–1)||Simon (3–3)||Crowe (1)||823||9–8
|0–1
|- align="center" bgcolor="ffdddd"
| March 10 ||No. 23 Tennessee|||| McKethan Stadium ||6–12||Bertolino (1–0)||Belflower (1–3)||Hicklen (2)||1,742||9–9
|0–2
|- align="center" bgcolor="ffdddd"
| March 11 ||No. 23 Tennessee|||| McKethan Stadium ||2–8||Crowe (3–0)||Wells (1–1)||None||1,470||9–10
|0–3
|- align="center" bgcolor="ddffdd"
| March 13 |||||| McKethan Stadium ||15–1||Hart (1–1)||Santopolo (0–2)||None||562||10–10||–
|- align="center" bgcolor="ddffdd"
| March 14 ||Fordham|||| McKethan Stadium ||11–3||Drucker (1–0)||Kelly (0–1)||None||841||11–10||–
|- align="center" bgcolor="ffdddd"
| March 16 ||at No. 11 ||||Alex Box StadiumBaton Rouge, LA||10-18||David (2–1)||Ramsey (1–2)||None||8,080||11–11||0–4
|- align="center" bgcolor="ffdddd"
| March 17 ||at No. 11 LSU||||Alex Box Stadium||3–4||Mestepey (3–0)||Ramshaw (1–2)||Guidry (2)||7,887||11–12||0–5
|- align="center" bgcolor="ffdddd"
| March 18 ||at No. 11 LSU||||Alex Box Stadium||7–10||Pettit (2–0)||Brice (1–1)||None||7,562||11–13||0–6
|- align="center" bgcolor="ddffdd"
| March 20 |||||| McKethan Stadium ||8–7||Ramsey (2–2)||Truman (0–1)||None||709||12–13
|–
|- align="center" bgcolor="ddffdd"
| March 21 ||Maine|||| McKethan Stadium ||19–9||Drucker (2–0)||Stoner (1–1)||None||586||13–13
|–
|- align="center" bgcolor="ddffdd"
| March 23 |||||| McKethan Stadium ||7–4||Birch (1–0)||Merryman (2–2)||None||1,336||14–13
|1–6
|- align="center" bgcolor="ddffdd"
| March 24 ||Arkansas|||| McKethan Stadium ||8–4||Ramshaw (2–2)||Isaacson (3–4)||None||1,468||15–13
|2–6
|- align="center" bgcolor="ddffdd"
| March 25 ||Arkansas|||| McKethan Stadium ||4–1||Hart (2–1)||Roehl (2–2)||Simon (1)||921||16–13
|3–6
|- align="center" bgcolor="ddffdd"
| March 27 |||||| McKethan Stadium ||9–3||Belflower (2–3)||Johnson (2–3)||None||761||17–13
|–
|- align="center" bgcolor="ddffdd"
| March 28 |||||| McKethan Stadium ||10–0||Rojas (1–0)||Core (4–5)||None||630||18–13
|–
|- align="center" bgcolor="ddffdd"
| March 30 ||at ||||Hawkins FieldNashville, TN||9–610||Simon (4–3)||Ransom (4–2)||None||325||19–13
|4–6
|- align="center" bgcolor="ddffdd"
| March 31 ||at Vanderbilt||||Hawkins Field||1–0||Ramshaw (3–2)||Little (3–3)||Ramsey (4)||510||20–13
|5–6
|-

|- align="center" bgcolor="ddffdd"
| April 1 ||Vanderbilt||||Hawkins Field||9–5||Rojas (2–0)||Maultsby (4–4)||None||349||21–13
|6–6
|- align="center" bgcolor="ddffdd"
| April 4 |||||| McKethan Stadium ||14–9||Belflower (3–3)||Castillo (2–1)||Ramsey (5)||913||22–13
|–
|- align="center" bgcolor="ddffdd"
| April 6 |||||| McKethan Stadium ||7–610||Ramsey (2–0)||Hooker (0–2)||None||2,012||23–13
|7–6
|- align="center" bgcolor="ddffdd"
| April 7 ||Kentucky|||| McKethan Stadium ||10–9||Rojas (3–0)||Wade (2–6)||None||2,738||24–13
|8–6
|- align="center" bgcolor="ddffdd"
| April 8 ||Kentucky|||| McKethan Stadium ||9–8||Simon (5–3)||Corrado (5–4)||Ramsey (6)||1,947||25–13
|9–6
|- align="center" bgcolor="ffdddd"
| April 11 ||No. 7 ||No. 23|| McKethan Stadium ||17-21||DiNardo (7–1)||Simon (5–4)||None||2,315||25–14||–
|- align="center" bgcolor="ffdddd"
| April 13 ||at ||No. 23||Foley FieldAthens, GA||4–9||Brown (4–2)||Brice (1–2)||None||2,074||25–15||9–7
|- align="center" bgcolor="ffdddd"
| April 14 ||at Georgia||No. 23||Foley Field||3–9||Murphy (5–1)||Ramshaw (3–3)||None||2,642||25–16||9–8
|- align="center" bgcolor="ddffdd"
| April 15 ||at Georgia||No. 23||Foley Field||7–6||Rojas (4–0)||Sharpton (3–1)||Ramsey (7)||254||26–16||10–8
|- align="center" bgcolor="ffdddd"
| April 18 ||at No. 10 Stetson||||Melching FieldDeLand, FL||8–9||Collins (9–0)||Simon (5–5)||None||2,762||26–17
|–
|- align="center" bgcolor="ffdddd"
| April 20 ||at No. 15 ||||Swayze FieldOxford, MS||1–9||Montrenes (8–3)||Brice (1–3)||None||1,912||26–18
|10–9
|- align="center" bgcolor="ffdddd"
| April 21 ||at No. 15 Ole Miss||||Swayze Field||9–12||Yates (6–0)||Rojas (4–1)||None||3,071||26–19
|10–10
|- align="center" bgcolor="ffdddd"
| April 22 ||at No. 15 Ole Miss||||Swayze Field||0–4||Gray (3–1)||Hart (2–2)||Bradshaw (1)||2,911||26–20
|10–11
|- align="center" bgcolor="F0E8E8"
| April 24  ||Canada (JR national team) (exh.)|| ||McKethan Stadium||23–5||Belflower||Grimes||None||222||–||–
|- align="center" bgcolor="ddffdd"
| April 27 ||No. 18 |||| McKethan Stadium ||11–4||Brice (2–3)||Maholm (5–3)||None||1,669||27–20
|11–11
|- align="center" bgcolor="ddffdd"
| April 28 ||No. 18 Mississippi State|||| McKethan Stadium ||4–210||Ramsey (4–2)||Medders (5–2)||None||1,972||28–20
|12–11
|- align="center" bgcolor="ddffdd"
| April 29 ||No. 18 Mississippi State|||| McKethan Stadium ||6–514||Simon (6–5)||Wooten (3–4)||None||1,522||29–20
|13–11
|-

|- align="center" bgcolor="ffdddd"
| May 4 ||at ||||Plainsman ParkAuburn, AL||2–5||Speigner (8–1)||Brice (2–4)||Brandon (4)||3,192||29–21||13–12
|- align="center" bgcolor="ddffdd"
| May 5 ||at Auburn||||Plainsman Park||10–6||Ramshaw (4–3)||Paxton (4–3)||Ramsey (8)||3,174||30–21
|14–12
|- align="center" bgcolor="ddffdd"
| May 6 ||at Auburn||||Plainsman Park||5–2||Hart (3–2)||Dueitt (3–3)||Belflower (1)||3,044||31–21
|15–12
|- align="center" bgcolor="ddffdd"
| May 9 ||||No. 30|| McKethan Stadium ||5–4||Simon (7–5)||Royal (3–5)||Belflower (2)||914||32–21
|–
|- align="center" bgcolor="ffdddd"
| May 11 ||No. 21 ||No. 30|| McKethan Stadium ||3–6||Bouknight (9–2)||Brice (2–5)||Gronkiewicz (14)||2,077||32–22||15–13
|- align="center" bgcolor="ddffdd"
| May 12 ||No. 21 South Carolina||No. 30|| McKethan Stadium ||14–7||Ramshaw (5–3)||Bell (10–5)||None||1,944||33–22||16–13
|- align="center" bgcolor="ffdddd"
| May 13 ||No. 21 South Carolina||No. 30|| McKethan Stadium ||4–6||Price (5–0)||Ramsey (4–3)||Gronkiewicz (15)||1,608||33–23||16–14
|-

|-
! style="background:#FF4A00;color:white;"| Post-season
|-

|- align="center" bgcolor="ffdddd"
| May 16 ||vs. (2) No. 11 LSU||(7)||Metropolitan StadiumHoover, AL||0–10||Scobie (4–1)||Brice (2–6)||None||3,522||33–24||0–1
|- align="center" bgcolor="ddffdd"
| May 17 ||vs. (3) No. 17 Tennessee||(7)||Metropolitan Stadium||9–3||Belflower (4–3)||Johnson (3–1)||Ramsey (9)||–||34–24||1–1
|- align="center" bgcolor="ffdddd"
| May 18 ||vs. (6) No. 23 Ole Miss||(7)||Metropolitan Stadium||6–7||Bradshaw (4–1)||Hart (3–3)||Morris (9)||–||34–25||1–2
|-

|- align="center" bgcolor="ddffdd"
| May 25 ||vs. (3) Stetson||(2)||Mark Light Stadium||10–9||Belflower (5–3)||Collins (10–3)||None||–||35–25||1–0
|- align="center" bgcolor="ffdddd"
| May 26 (1) ||at (1) No. 1 Miami (FL)Rivalry||(2)||Mark Light Stadium||2–6||Farmer (13–2)||Hart (3–4)||None||4,850||35–26||1–1
|- align="center" bgcolor="ffdddd"
| May 26 (2) ||vs. (3) Stetson||(2)||Mark Light Stadium||3–6||Lincoln (6–0)||Simon (7–6)||Wilson (10)||5,155||35–27||1–2
|-

Rankings from Collegiate Baseball. All times Eastern. Retrieved from FloridaGators.com

See also 
 Florida Gators
 List of Florida Gators baseball players

References

External links 
 Gator Baseball official website

Florida Gators baseball seasons
Florida Gators baseball team
Florida Gators
Florida